Stupenda is a genus of sea sponges. It is the only genus in the monotypic family Stupendidae and is represented by a single species, Stupenda singularis.

Habitat 
Stupenda singularis is found near the Colville Ridge, in the waters of the New Zealand Exclusive Economic Zone.

References 

Tetractinellida
Monotypic sponge genera
Animals described in 2016
Taxa named by Michelle Kelly (marine scientist)